The Buried Life is the second album by American rock band Medicine, released on October 12, 1993 by American Recordings.

Track listing

Personnel 
Medicine
 Jim Goodall – drums, tape
 Stefanie Fife – cello
 He Goak – bass guitar
 Brad Laner – vocals, guitar, percussion, piano, production
 Miriam Mayer – violin, cello
 Beth Thompson – vocals, tape

Production and design
 Chris Apthorp – engineering, mixing
 Julie Carter – design
 Richard Hasal – mixing
 Judy Koenig – painting
 Medicine – mixing, design

References

External links 
 

1993 albums
American Recordings (record label) albums
Medicine (band) albums